Deconica goniospora is a species of mushroom in the family Strophariaceae. It is found in Sri Lanka.

References

Strophariaceae
Fungi described in 1871
Fungi of Asia
Taxa named by Miles Joseph Berkeley
Taxa named by Christopher Edmund Broome